Andreas Anton (born 13 November 1983 in Villingen-Schwennigen) is a German social scientist.

Background and fields of interest 
Anton grew up in Trossingen and studied sociology, history and cognitive sciences at Albert-Ludwigs-Universität in Freiburg, Germany.  

While in school and later during his studies, he worked as an intern at the Freiburg Institut für Grenzgebiete der Psychologie und Psychohygiene (IGPP). The IGPP is a private research institute and maintains a specialized library and research archive closely related to Hans Bender's former parapsychology chair at Freiburg University.

Anton is interested in anomalistics and conspiracy theories, and is currently working on a doctorate on occultism and parapsychological topics in the former GDR.

He is the brother of Matthias Anton, a German saxophonist and jazz musician, and is the grandson of German author Herbert Walz.

Publications and academic work
With regard to Esoteric Nazism, his work indicates that earlier descriptions of the relationship between Nazi ideologies and occultism (either excluding any relationship or stating a strong one) do not describe properly the rather polycratic and zigzagging complicated setup. After having published on WWII Kriegsmarine dowsing experiments for location purposes, Anton provided a shared contribution in a recent volume revisiting the overall topic of alleged Nazi Occultism.

Together with Michael Schetsche and Michael Walter, he is among the editors of Konspiration. Soziologie des Verschwörungsdenkens. (Conspiracy - Sociology of conspirative thinking) published by Springer in 2014. According to Alan Schink's review, the volume tries to reduce overly sceptic  tendencies without becoming too one-sided. Armin Pfahl-Traughber's review of Anton's Wissensoziologie doubts the innovative character of his approach to conspiracy theories while acknowledging the value of his case studies. The left leaning Jungle World claims relativism and social constructivism. Their review of Konspiration mentions Schetsche's and Anton's roles in the IGPP and as board members of Gesellschaft für Anomalistik and states a lack of will to denounce false opinions and prejudice because of that connection. Frankfurter Allgemeine Zeitung called it the first anthology about conspirational thinking in the humanities and a serious and readable contribution to the field.

Augsburger Allgemeine asked him about conspiracy theories with relation to some recently founded political parties in Germany. Both Piratenpartei or Alternative for Deutschland had trouble with highly active members, that pushed time-consuming debates about   various theories, from Aliens,  faked moon landings till big finance behind the Greek crisis.    The newspaper stated Anton's experience, that it is rather difficult to discuss matters with devoted conspiracy theorists, but smaller (and new) parties seem to attract them. The basic feeling of some of the adherents of new parties, which raise doubts about the news reports from  classical media is - however - in line with some of Anton's assumptions. He was quoted as saying, "we experience simplification of overcomplex topics. The feeling, one doesn't get told about everything is understandeable." His point about conspiracy playing an increasing role in current popular cultures has been stated in media articles about Anton and his work.

Radio Bremen and NDR have interviewed Anton on his work on conspiracy theories and the interaction with the media. Radio Bremen described him as wanting to have a closer look on those topics and being interested in the questions raised by such topics. Schetsche and Schmidt (2014) describe Anton's contributions about (actual) post war mind control experiments as documenting a reales Verweissystem (reality based reference system) for neomyths like the Satanic ritual abuse moral panic.

He has contributed to Telepolis and other online magazines.

Parapsychology and ioccultism in Communist Eastern Germany 

The Okkulte DDR research projects receives funding from the DFG, the Deutsche Forschungsgemeinschaft (German Research Foundation) and deals with paranormal experiences, knowledge bases, and practices. The projects evaluates governmental responses in dealing and interacting with such phenomena and elaborates on the private, public and scientific debate of parapsychological topics in the GDR and    tries to enlarge the empiric data e.g. via interviews and studies on official documents, media reports, books and films and court files.

Preliminary results show a dichotomy between the official scientific approach completely rejecting paranormal phenomena, and  people's actual experiences and practices in the GDR. Previous studies (by Ina Schmied, coworker in the GDR project) showed no large differences with regard to paranormal experiences (e.g. near-death experiences) in the GDR  compared to the West. While the Soviet Union had some PSI research projects and was much more tolerant towards such tendencies, some of the Soviet studies were published in the West but not made available in the GDR. According to a Schwäbische Zeitung interview with Anton, the Stasi did not have an X-Files department and was less interested in the phenomena as such - they reacted on any sort of heterodox group or institution building.

Ufos 
He is coeditor of a volume on  UFO-research. He was invited to present some of his results at the German Mars society Raumfahrttage in Neubrandenburg. Anton states a social stigma related with UFO sightings (and the related research) and states a strong difference between SETI research - which predominantly tries to identify alien life forms and serious UFO research, the latter having to include further possible explanations.  The basic acknowledgement of a SETI related background evokes strong fears and defensive reflexes - against the loss of an anthropocentric world view, narcissistic injury, and fear about the relationship with a probably superior alien. The use of ridicule and the focus on the ET aspect may overshadow actual phenomena that need to be  taken more fully into account.

Anton and other contributors therefore prefer to include national initiatives such as the French GEIPAN and the Hessdalen AMS projects within a serious international network combining (natural) science and humanities aspects.  Diesseits der Denkverbote. Bausteine für eine reflexive UFO-Forschung concludes with a manifesto for a more reflected UFO-research.

Selected publications

Books 
 Anton, A., Schetsche, M. & Walter, M. K. (ed.) (2013). Konspiration. Soziologie des Verschwörungsdenkens. Wiesbaden: Springer VS.
 Schetsche, M. & Anton, A. (ed.) (2013). Diesseits der Denkverbote. Bausteine für eine reflexive UFO-Forschung. Berlin: LIT Verlag.
 Anton, A. (2011). Unwirkliche Wirklichkeiten. Zur Wissenssoziologie von Verschwörungstheorien. Reihe: PeriLog  Freiburger Beiträge zur Kultur- und Sozialforschung ; Berlin: Logos.

References

External sources

 Anton's IGPP entry
 Okkulte DDR Project website

1983 births
Parapsychologists
German social scientists
People from Villingen-Schwenningen
University of Freiburg alumni
Living people